A general election was held in the U.S. state of Kentucky on November 3, 2015. All of Kentucky's executive officers were up for election. Primary elections were held on May 19, 2015.

Governor and Lieutenant Governor

Incumbent Democratic Governor Steve Beshear was term-limited and could not run for re-election to a third term in office.

In Kentucky, gubernatorial candidates pick their own running mates and they are elected on shared tickets in both the primary and general elections.

The candidates for the Democratic nomination were Attorney General of Kentucky Jack Conway and his running mate State Representative Sannie Overly; and retired engineer and 2014 Congressional candidate Geoff Young and his running mate Jonathan Masters. Conway and Overly easily defeated Young and Masters in the primary election for the Democratic Party nomination.

For the Republicans, businessman and candidate for the U.S. Senate in 2014 Matt Bevin ran on a ticket with Tea Party activist and 2014 State House candidate Jenean Hampton; Agriculture Commissioner of Kentucky James Comer ran on a ticket with State Senator Christian McDaniel; former Louisville Metro Councilman and nominee for Mayor of Louisville in 2010 Hal Heiner ran on a ticket with former Lexington-Fayette Urban County Councilwoman and nominee for Kentucky State Treasurer in 2011 K.C. Crosbie; and former Associate Justice of the Kentucky Supreme Court Will T. Scott ran on a ticket with former Menifee County Sheriff Rodney Coffey. Bevin held an 83-vote lead over Comer in the primary election, with both Heiner and Scott conceding. The Associated Press, referring to the race between Bevin and Comer a "virtual tie", did not call the race in favor of either candidate. In addition, Comer refused to concede and stated that he would ask for a recanvass. The request for recanvass was filed with the Kentucky Secretary of State's office on May 20, 2015 with Secretary of State Alison Lundergan Grimes ordering the recanvass to occur at 9:00 a.m. local time on May 28, 2015. Upon completion of the recanvass, Grimes announced that Bevin remained 83 votes ahead of Comer. Grimes also stated that should Comer want a full recount, it would require a court order from the Franklin Circuit Court. On May 29, Comer announced he would not request a recount and conceded the nomination to Bevin.

Results

Attorney General
Incumbent Democratic Attorney General Jack Conway was term-limited and could not run for re-election to a third term in office. He instead ran for Governor.

Andy Beshear's campaign received illegal campaign contributions from a man working for Beshear's father, whom Beshear himself later hired. The man contributed the money from illegal kickbacks he had received, and ultimately went to prison for bribery. Tim Longmeyer was working for Beshear's father, at the time Kentucky's governor, as a member of his cabinet when Longmeyer accepted $212,000 in illegal kickbacks from companies, for steering $2 million in Kentucky state contracts to them.  Longmeyer then used the kickback monies to make illegal campaign contributions. Longmeyer contributed some of the money to Andy Beshear's campaign. Andy Beshear, after winning the race, hired Longmeyer to be his own top deputy, the second-most-powerful law enforcement officer in the state, and prosecutors said that in that new role under Beshear, Longmeyer accepted $1,000 to steer Kentucky state contracts to some law firms. Longmeyer resigned right before federal charges were leveled against him. Longmeyer was ultimately charged, pled guilty, and was sentenced to 70 months incarceration for bribery, which he is serving in a federal prison in Alabama.

Beshear defeated Republican Whitney Westerfield by a margin of 0.2 percent, getting 50.1% of the vote to Westerfield's 49.9%. The margin was approximately 2,000 votes.

Democratic primary

Candidates
Declared
 Andy Beshear, attorney and son of Governor Steve Beshear

Declined
 Alison Lundergan Grimes, Secretary of State of Kentucky and nominee for the U.S. Senate in 2014 (running for re-election)
 Jennifer Moore, former Chairwoman of the Kentucky Democratic Party
 John Tilley, state representative

Republican primary

Candidates
Declared
 Michael T. Hogan, Lawrence County Attorney
 Whitney Westerfield, state senator

Declined
 Luke Morgan, attorney
 Mark Wohlander, attorney

Results

General election

Polling

Results

Secretary of State
Incumbent Democratic Secretary of State Alison Lundergan Grimes was eligible to run for re-election to a second term in office. She had considered running for Governor of Kentucky or for Attorney General of Kentucky. She decided to seek re-election.

Democratic primary

Candidates
Declared
 Charles Lovett, candidate for Jefferson County Justice of the Peace in 2010
 Alison Lundergan Grimes, incumbent Secretary of State and nominee for the U.S. Senate in 2014

Declined
 Colmon Elridge, aide to Governor Steve Beshear and former Executive Vice President of Young Democrats of America
 David O'Neill, Fayette County Property Valuation Administrator

Results

Republican primary

Candidates
Declared
 Steve Knipper, former Erlanger City Councilman

Withdrew
 Michael Pitzer, candidate for the State House in 2008

Declined
 Michael Adams, attorney and general counsel for the Republican Governors Association
 Matt Bevin, businessman and candidate for U.S. Senate in 2014 (ran for Governor)
 Ken Fleming, former Louisville Metro Council member
 Damon Thayer, Majority Leader of the Kentucky Senate

General election

Polling

Results

State Auditor
Incumbent Democratic State Auditor Adam Edelen had considered running for Governor in 2015, even lining up a running mate, but ultimately declined to do so. He instead ran for re-election to a second term in office.

Democratic primary

Candidates
Declared
 Adam Edelen, incumbent State Auditor

Declined
 Chris Tobe, CFA, writer, former trustee of the Kentucky Retirement Systems and former staffer to State Auditor Ed Hatchett

Republican primary

Candidates
Declared
 Mike Harmon, State Representative and candidate for Lieutenant Governor of Kentucky in 2011

Declined
 Damon Thayer, Majority Leader of the Kentucky Senate

General election

Polling

Results

State Treasurer
Incumbent Democratic State Treasurer Todd Hollenbach was term-limited and could not run for re-election to a third term in office. He had said that he may run for another office in 2015, but did not specify which, and eventually declined to run for another statewide office. He instead successfully ran for an open seat on the Jefferson County District Court, defeating 20 other candidates.

Democratic primary

Candidates
Declared
 Neville Blakemore, Executive Chairman of Great Northern Building Products and nominee for Louisville Metro Council in 2006
 Jim Glenn, State Representative and candidate for State Auditor in 2003
 Daniel Grossberg, Jefferson County Commissioner and President of the Louisville Young Democrats
 Richard Henderson, former State Representative and former Mayor of Jeffersonville
 Rick Nelson, state representative

Declined
 Colmon Elridge, aide to Governor Steve Beshear and former Executive Vice President of Young Democrats of America
 Dee Dee Ford-Keene, businesswoman and former President of the Democratic Women's Club of Kentucky
 Chris Tobe, CFA, writer, former trustee of the Kentucky Retirement Systems and former staffer to State Auditor Ed Hatchett

Results

Republican primary

Candidates
Declared
 Allison Ball, attorney 
 Kenny Imes, state representative
 Jon Larson, former Fayette County Judge/Executive, candidate for Attorney General in 2007 and nominee for Kentucky's 6th congressional district in 2008

Results

General election

Polling

Results

Agriculture Commissioner
Incumbent Republican Agriculture Commissioner James Comer did not run for re-election to a second term in office. He instead ran for Governor, and was defeated by Matt Bevin in the Republican primary.

Democratic primary

Candidates
Declared
 Jean-Marie Lawson Spann, businesswoman, radio host and agriculture activist

Declined
 Dennis Parrett, state senator

Republican primary

Candidates
Declared
 Richard Heath, state representative
 Ryan Quarles, state representative

Declined
 James Comer, incumbent Agriculture Commissioner
 Paul Hornback, state senator
 Damon Thayer, Majority Leader of the Kentucky Senate

Results

General election

Polling

Results

Kentucky Supreme Court

District 7
A non-partisan special election was held along with the May 19, 2015 primary elections to fill the 7th district seat of the Kentucky Supreme Court.  The seat was vacated when Justice Will T. Scott resigned to run for Governor.  The winner of the election will serve the remainder of Scott's term, with the seat coming up for re-election next in 2020.

Candidates

Declared
 Janet Stumbo, Kentucky Court of Appeals Judge and former Kentucky Supreme Court Justice
 Sam Wright, Kentucky Circuit Court Judge

Withdrew
 John Lewis, Elliott County Attorney

Results

References